Aleksander Ścibor-Rylski (16 March 1928 – 3 April 1983) was a Polish screenwriter and film director. He wrote for more than 25 films between 1951 and 1981. he was born in aristocratic family of Clan Ostoja.

Selected filmography
 Rok pierwszy (1960)
 The Impossible Goodbye (1962)
 Black Wings (1963)
 The Ashes (1965)
 Man of Marble (1976)
 Dagny (1977)
 Man of Iron (1981)

See also
 Zbigniew Ścibor-Rylski
 Clan Ostoja
 Ostoja coat of arms

References

External links

1928 births
1983 deaths
Polish film directors
People from Grudziądz
20th-century Polish screenwriters
Male screenwriters
20th-century Polish male writers